Péré is a former commune in the Charente-Maritime department in southwestern France. On 1 January 2018, it was merged into the new commune of Saint-Pierre-la-Noue.

Population

See also
Communes of the Charente-Maritime department

References

Former communes of Charente-Maritime
Populated places disestablished in 2018